The list of ship launches in 1728 includes a chronological list of some ships launched in 1728.


References

1728
Ship launches